Lui Kung Tin is a village in Pat Heung, Yuen Long District, Hong Kong.

History
The Kap Lung Ancient Trail was historically the main route taken by farmers in the vicinity of Pat Heung, Shek Kong and Lui Kung Tin for selling their produce in the markets in Tsuen Wan.

References

External links
 Delineation of area of existing village Lui Kung Tin Tsuen (Pat Heung) for election of resident representative (2019 to 2022)

Villages in Yuen Long District, Hong Kong
Pat Heung